Uutiset, the Finnish word for "news", may refer to:
 Kansan Uutiset, a newspaper
 Kymmenen uutiset, a television broadcast
 SVT Uutiset, a television broadcast
 Yle Uutiset, a television broadcast